Chelqai (also Romanized as Chelqā’ī) is a village in Benajuy-ye Sharqi Rural District, in the Central District of Bonab County, East Azerbaijan Province, Iran. At the 2006 census, its population was 4,573, in 1,142 families.

References 

Populated places in Bonab County